Wild-Eyed Southern Boys is the fourth studio album by the southern rock band 38 Special, released in January 1981.

Record World said that the single "Fantasy Girl" has a "smooth vocal and a virtuoso guitar display."

Track listing
"Hold On Loosely" (Don Barnes, Jim Peterik, Jeff Carlisi) – 4:39
"First Time Around" (Barnes, Carlisi, Larry Steele, Donnie Van Zant) – 3:59
"Wild-Eyed Southern Boys" (Peterik) – 4:18
"Back Alley Sally" (Carlisi, Van Zant) – 3:11
"Fantasy Girl" (Carlisi, Peterik) – 4:06
"Hittin' and Runnin'" (Barnes, Peterik) – 4:55
"Honky Tonk Dancer" (Barnes, Steele, Van Zant) – 4:59
"Throw Out the Line" (Barnes, Carlisi, Van Zant) – 3:45
"Bring It On" (Carlisi, Steele, Van Zant) – 5:38

Personnel
Donnie Van Zant – lead vocals (2–4, 7, 8, 9), backing vocals
Don Barnes – rhythm and lead guitar, piano (3), lead vocals (1, 3, 5, 6), backing vocals
Jeff Carlisi – lead and rhythm guitar, steel guitar
Larry Junstrom – bass
Steve Brookins – drums
Jack Grondin – drums

Additional personnel
Steve McRay – piano (4, 6, 7)
Terry Emery – percussion
Carol Bristow – backing vocals
Lu Moss – backing vocals
Carol Veto – backing vocals

Production
Producer: Rodney Mills
Engineers: Rodney Mills, Greg Quesnel
Cover art painting: Larry Gerber

Charts
Album – Billboard (United States)

Singles – Billboard (United States)

References

38 Special (band) albums
1981 albums
A&M Records albums
Albums produced by Rodney Mills